Sajik Station is a station of Busan Metro Line 3 in Sajik-dong, Dongnae District, Busan, South Korea. It is associated with the Busan Sajik Baseball Stadium, home of the Lotte Giants.

External links

  Cyber station information from Busan Transportation Corporation

Busan Metro stations
Dongnae District
Railway stations opened in 2005